is a Ryukyuan gusuku in Kumejima, Okinawa, on Kume Island. It is located in Tunnaha Forest Park.

References

Castles in Okinawa Prefecture
Kumejima, Okinawa